Periclimenes amethysteus is a species of shrimp found in the Adriatic and Aegean Sea, and the western Mediterranean Sea. It was first named by Antoine Risso in 1827.

References

External links
 

Palaemonidae
Crustaceans of the Atlantic Ocean
Crustaceans described in 1827
Taxa named by Antoine Risso